The Siege (also known as The Castle) is a novel by Albanian author Ismail Kadare, first published in 1970 in Tirana as Kështjella. It tells about the Albanian-Ottoman war during the time of Skanderbeg. It was translated into French by Jusuf Vrioni and then from French into English by David Bellos under the title The Siege. Bellos in his afterword suggests that the book is patterned after Marin Barleti's work The Siege of Shkodra. The narrator of the novel is however not an Albanian fighting for Skanderbeg but a member of the besieging Ottoman army.

See also
Albanian literature

References

1970 novels
20th-century Albanian novels
Novels by Ismail Kadare
Novels set in Albania
Novels set in the 15th century
Canongate Books books